Industrial training institutes (ITI) and industrial training centers (ITC) are post-secondary schools in India constituted under the Directorate General of Training (DGT), Ministry of Skill Development and Entrepreneurship, Union Government, to provide training in various trades.

Training schemes

Craftsmen Training Scheme (CTS)
The Directorate General of Training (DGT) initiated the Craftsmen Training Scheme in 1950. Training periods range from six months to two years in over 130 different specialties. Prerequisites for the courses range from 8th to 12th class pass. Upon completion of the training, trainees write the All India Trade Test (AITT). Successful candidates receive the National Trade Certificate (NTC).

Admission
Admission to the various trades of ITI/ITC is done every year in August. The ITI Admission Procedure is started before the commencement of the new session. Sessions under this scheme starts from 1 August. Under the NCVT guidelines admission in ITIs is made on merit based / written examination. Admission to the private ITIs are done directly.

Trades
Some trades under this scheme are listed below. 

ITI conduct two types of trades for admission M-Group and G-group.

Building Maintenance
Biotechnologist
Electronics Mechanic
Excavator Operator (Mining)
Mechanic Repair & Maintenance of Two Wheeler's
Mechanic Auto Electrical and Electronics
Sanitary Hardware fitter
Architectural Assistant
Carpenter
Domestic Painter
Foundry man Technician
Gold Smith
Industrial Painter
Interior Decoration and Designing
Marine Engine Fitter
Mason (Building Constructor)
Mechanic Repair & Maintenance of Heavy Vehicles
Mechanic Repair & Maintenance of Light Vehicles
Mechanic Diesel Engine
Mechanic (Tractor)
Mechanic Communication Equipment Maintenance
Mechanic Lens or Prism Grinding
Physiotherapy Technician
Plastic Processing Operator
Plumber
Pump Operator-cum-Mechanic
Rubber Technician
Sheet Metal Worker
Stone Mining Machine Operator
Stone Processing Machines Operator
Welder (Gas and Electric)
Attendant Operator (Chemical Plant)
Draughtsman (Civil)
Draughtsman (Mechanical)
Electrician
Electroplater
Fitter
Instrument Mechanic
Instrument Mechanic (Chemical Plant)
Information Communication Technology System Maintenance
Laboratory Assistant (Chemical Plant)
Lift and Escalator Mechanic
Machinist
Machinist (Grinder)
Maintenance Mechanic (Chemical Plant)
Marine Fitter
Mechanic Mining Machinery
Mechanic Agricultural Machinery
Mechanic Computer Hardware
Mechanic Consumer Electronics Appliances
Mechanic-cum-Operator Electronics Communication System
Mechanic Industrial Electronics
Mechanic Machine Tools Maintenance
Mechanic Mechatronic
Mechanic Medical Electronics
Mechanic Motor Vehicle
Mechanic (Refrigeration and Air-Conditioner)
Mechanic (Radio & TV)
Operator Advanced Machine Tools
Painter General
Radiology Technician
Spinning Technician
Surveyor
Textile Mechatronics
Textile Wet Processing Technician
Tool & Die Maker (Dies &Moulds)
Tool & Die Maker (Press Tools, Jigs & Fixtures)
Turner
Vessel Navigator
Weaving Technician
Wire man
Cabin or Room Attendant
Computer Aided Embroidery And Designing
Corporate House Keeping
Counselling Skills
Creche Management
Driver Cum Mechanic (Light Motor Vehicle)
Data Entry Operator
Domestic House Keeping
Event Management Assistant
Firemen
Front Office Assistant
Hospital Waste Management
Institution House Keeping
Insurance Agent
Library & Information Science
Medical Transcription
Network Technician
Old Age Care Assistant
Para Legal Assistant or Munshi
Preparatory School Management (Assistant)
Spa Therapy
Tourist Guide
Baker & Confectioner
Cane Willow and Bamboo Worker
Catering and Hospitality Assistant
Computer Operator and Programing Assistant
Craftsman Food Production (General)
Craftsman Food Production (Vegetarian)
Cutting and Sewing
Dairying
Desktop Publishing Operator
Digital Photographer
Dress Making
Surface Ornamentation Techniques (Embroidery)
Fashion Design and Technology
Finance Executive
Fire Technology 
Floriculture and Landscaping
Footwear Maker
Basic Cosmetology
Health Safety and Environment
Health Sanitary Inspector
Horticulture
Hospital House Keeping
Human Resource Executive
Leather Goods Maker
Litho Offset Machine Minder
Marketing Executive
Multimedia Animation and Special Effects
Office Assistant cum Computer Operator
Photographer
Plate Maker cum Impositor
Preservation of Fruits and Vegetables
Process Cameraman
Secretarial Practice (English)
Stenographer & Secretarial Assistant (English)
Stenographer & Secretarial oratory Equipment Technician
Architectural Draughtsmanship
Resource Person
Drawing/Mathematics
Web Designing and Computer Graphics
Agro Processing
Food Beverage
Foods and Vegetable Processing
Information Technology 
Art terms
Basic safety and shopfloor safety
Travel & Tourism

Schemes/Courses for ITI pass outs

Apprenticeship Training Scheme
After completing ITI, tradesmen can undergo apprenticeship training in different industries. The Scheme is implemented by Directorate General of Training under Ministry of Skill Development and Entrepreneurship with the objective that "Training imparted in Institutions alone is not sufficient for acquisition of skills and needs to be supplemented by training in the actual work place."

Duration for Apprenticeship training is generally one year for those appeared in ITI final exam, i.e. AITT. For freshers usually it takes three years. During the training trainees are paid stipend on monthly basis.

Lateral Entry to Polytechnic Diploma Engineering
Polytechnics approved by AICTE offer engineering courses for 3 years duration through an entrance exam known with different name in different states (JEXPO in West Bengal, JEEP in Uttarakhand, JEECUP in Uttar Pradesh, CG PPT in Chandigarh etc.).And After the completion of the course candidates are awarded with diploma in different disciplines. Those who have passed minimum 2 years ITI course with National Trade Certificate are given an opportunity to go for a lateral entry directly to the 2nd year of the Polytechnic diploma course. Entrance exam known as VOCLET is conducted every year for this purpose along with the JEXPO.

References 

Vocational education in India
Training organisations in India
Engineering education in India
Industrial Training Institute